Tesoma is a district in Tampere, Finland, located west of the city centre. It largely comprises Lake Tesoma with its surroundings, including the quarters: Epilänharju, Tohloppi, Haukiluoma, Lamminpää, Myllypuro, Ikuri, Ristimäki and Tesomajärvi.

Tesoma features the Tesoma Swimming Hall, an indoor swimming pool; the Tesoma Ice Rink, an ice rink that serves as home to the Tampereen Ilves Naiset; the Tesoma Church; and the Westeri shopping center.

References

External links 
Tesoma form the official cities of the Tampere city 

Districts of Tampere